The 2020–21 Yale Bulldogs Men's ice hockey season would have been the 126th season of play for the program and the 60th season in the ECAC Hockey conference.

Season
As a result of the ongoing COVID-19 pandemic the entire college ice hockey season was delayed. Despite the issues, Yale and most of ECAC Hockey were expecting to start playing some time in November. After the team had assembled and began practicing, however, a sizable number of Bulldog players tested positive for coronavirus. On October 16, Yale raised the campus alert status from green to yellow when the 18th member of the men's ice hockey team tested positive. Less than a month later, the Ivy League, Yale's primary conference, announced that it was cancelling all winter sports for 2020–21. Additionally the schools would not be participating in any Spring sports until the end of February. The announcement was not particularly surprising, considering that, unlike other conference, the Ivy League does not rely on revenue generated from its athletic programs.

Because the NCAA had previously announced that all winter sports athletes would retain whatever eligibility they possessed through at least the following year, none of Yale's players would lose a season of play. However, the NCAA also approved a change in its transfer regulations that would allow players to transfer and play immediately rather than having to sit out a season, as the rules previously required. Because of this, players who would have been members of Yale for the 2021 season had a pathway to leave the program and play for another university.

While all Ivy League teams were shut down, the cancellation of Yale's ice hockey season was particularly galling. World Wars, the Great Depression and even their own home rink burning down had never completely hindered the Elis before but, for the first time in 125 years, Yale University would not play an official ice hockey game due to COVID-19.

Departures

Recruiting

† played junior hockey or equivalent during 2020–21 season.

Roster
As of December 31, 2020.

Standings

Schedule and results
Season Cancelled

References

Yale Bulldogs men's ice hockey seasons
Yale Bulldogs
Yale Bulldogs
Yale Bulldogs men's ice hockey
Yale Bulldogs men's ice hockey